Operation Joshua, also known as Operation Sheba, was the 1985 airlifting of Ethiopian Jews from refugee camps in Sudan to Israel.

Ethiopian Jews had fled to refugee camps in Sudan from a severe famine in their country. The Israeli Operation Moses had previously airlifted 8,000 people to Israel from November 21, 1984, to January 5, 1985, but when word leaked out to the press, under pressure from other Muslim countries, Sudan blocked further flights, leaving many behind. 

All 100 United States senators signed a secret petition to President Ronald Reagan, asking him to have the evacuation resumed. Vice President George H. W. Bush then arranged a follow-up mission called Operation Joshua. On March 22, 1985, six United States Air Force C-130 Hercules transport aircraft were dispatched, landing near Al Qadarif. "Around 500", "more than 500" or "around 650" Jews were located and transported to Ovda Airport in southern Israel.

See also 
Aliyah from Ethiopia
Operation Solomon
Jewish Agency for Israel

Further reading 
Mitchell G. Bard, From Tragedy to Triumph: The Politics Behind the Rescue of Ethiopian Jewry, 2002, p. 161 - 170

References

External links
Operations Moses and Joshua



Aliyah operations
Beta Israel
United States Air Force
Airlifts
Jewish Ethiopian history
1985 in Sudan
1985 in Israel
1985 in international relations
Israel–United States military relations